Rosemary "Rosie" Ribbons (born 22 July 1983) is a Welsh singer-songwriter. She achieved fame by being one of the finalists in the ITV1 talent show Pop Idol. Subsequently, she went on to have two UK top 20 hits.

Early life 
In the early 1980s, her English father (from north London), Ronald, visited Australia. He met and married Rosie's mother Carol, and the family moved to Pontardawe near Swansea when Rosie was four, to be near Ronald's parents who had moved from London to South Wales for work prior to retiring.

Ribbons reportedly wanted to be a pop singer since she was eight years old. A big fan of Mariah Carey, she learned to mimic her singing, and also started to write her own songs. She lost interest during her final school year, passing only two GCSEs, English and Drama.

Pop Idol
In 2001, bored with her supermarket job, Ribbons auditioned for ITV1's talent show Pop Idol. She initially performed her own composition called "Colours" to judges Simon Cowell, Nicki Chapman, Neil Fox and record producer Pete Waterman. Although impressed with her vocal, Cowell suggested that she pick a more familiar song. Taking his advice, Ribbons then wowed the panel with a rendition of "Hero" by Mariah Carey, a performance that moved Waterman to tears.

Ribbons progressed through the competition and made the top 50. She won her heat by a landslide with a version of "(Everything I Do) I Do It for You" by Bryan Adams, receiving over half of the total votes cast for her group. At this juncture Ribbons was named amongst the favourites to win, but was voted out by viewers a few weeks before Will Young was crowned winner on 9 February 2002, ultimately finishing in 6th place.

Telstar
Although Ribbons did not win Pop Idol, Telstar Records signed her to a five-album deal, reportedly worth £1,000,000. After supporting Liberty X on tour, her first two singles "Blink" and "A Little Bit" (a cover of a Jessica Simpson song) were both UK top-20 hits. After the disappointing chart position of "A Little Bit" Telstar went to work on getting ready to release the third single only a few weeks later. Initially Telstar had chosen "Good Thing" before deciding on a double A Side, featuring "Good Thing" and "Heaven". After supporting Blue on their "One Love" Tour Telstar decided that a totally fresh, new track had to be released something guaranteed to succeed. Rosie was back in the studio recording a modern-day remake of the Deee-Lite hit "Groove is in the Heart". At one point there were discussions that the double A side would feature "Naked" and "Groove is in the Heart". Due to Telstar's financial problems her contract was subsequently terminated before the third single or album could be released.

Even though this million-pound deal was terminated, a promotional version of Ribbons's debut album did surface under the title Misbehaving. The track list included her self-written Pop Idol audition song "Colours", among the following:

"Good Thing" (4:03)
"A Little Bit" (4:02)
"Blink" (3:15)
"Deadly Sin #8" (3:30)
"Heaven" (3:52)
"Coming Up for Air" (3:45)
"Trusted" (3:51)
"No Space to Rent" (3:32)
"Even Angels" (3:48)
"Ain't That the Way" (4:09)
"Colours" (4:13)

According to the forthcoming album information on the official artwork of the "Blink" single, this unreleased debut was originally titled Levitate. The album would finally be released by Phoenix Music International who acquired the Telstar back catalogue in 2018

In 2005 Ribbons returned to the studio to work on a new album. Three tracks were recorded and due to appear on this album ("Nothing's Changed" and "If Only the World Could Smile"). Clips of these recordings could be heard on her official Myspace page, however, no new album or singles were released.

Australian Idol
In 2007, now living in Dubbo, Australia, Ribbons auditioned for Australian Idol with another original song, "Butterfly Wings". This time the judges did not ask for a second, more familiar song. She was accepted into the Top 100 and went on to make the Top 24. In the fourth semi-finals on 29 August 2007 Ribbons sang R.E.M.'s "Everybody Hurts". She was the last contestant to perform on the night. On 30 August 2007, Ribbons did not make the final 12, nor was she chosen to come back as a wild card, therefore she was officially eliminated from the competition.

Recent career
Ribbons returned to the UK after Australian Idol to perform and record new music. She released the single "Turning Point" featuring MOBO Award winner MC Neat in 2011.

In March 2012 Ribbons was the featured vocalist on the title track of the Alonestar EP "Warrior", a release which also featured English singer-songwriter and Brit Award winner Ed Sheeran, who accompanies Ribbons on the track "All Falls Down" from the same EP.

Discography

Singles

Albums

References

External links
 Official website
 Rosie releases album

1983 births
Australian Idol participants
People from Swansea
Pop Idol contestants
21st-century Welsh women singers
Australian emigrants to Wales
Living people
People from Pontardawe
Welsh people of English descent
Welsh pop singers
21st-century Australian women singers